Gwar is an American heavy metal band formed in Richmond, Virginia in 1984. Their discography includes fifteen studio albums, two live albums, two compilation albums, and two EPs. The band has also released nine singles.

Discography

Studio albums

EPs

Live albums

Compilation albums

Videography

References

Heavy metal group discographies
Discographies of American artists
Discography
Comedian discographies